Ningbingia res is a species of air-breathing land snail, a terrestrial pulmonate gastropod mollusk in the family Camaenidae. This species is endemic to Australia.

References

 2006 IUCN Red List of Threatened Species.   Downloaded on 7 August 2007.

Gastropods of Australia
res
Vulnerable fauna of Australia
Gastropods described in 1981
Taxonomy articles created by Polbot